Jenny, portrayed by Georgia Tennant (credited as Georgia Moffett, then her maiden name), is a fictional character in the long-running British science fiction television series Doctor Who. She appeared in the episode "The Doctor's Daughter", originally broadcast 10 May 2008. Jenny is the daughter of the series protagonist the Doctor, a product of altered DNA extracted from a tissue sample of his tenth incarnation's hand. The character was created by writer Stephen Greenhorn.

Georgia Tennant (then-Moffett) was cast as Jenny after auditioning for a smaller part in the episode "The Unicorn and the Wasp", and impressing the series producers. The character was generally well received by reviewers, with many speculating that she would return to the franchise. Moffett also expressed an interest in this possibility.

The actress is the daughter of the actor Peter Davison, who portrayed the Doctor's fifth incarnation from 1981 to 1984. Then named Georgia Moffett (her father's legal surname), she met David Tennant – playing the tenth incarnation of the Doctor – on the set; they began a relationship, and married in 2011.

Appearance
When the Doctor's time travelling TARDIS is drawn to the planet Messaline, his DNA is used by warring human soldiers on the planet in a Progenation Machine, a device that instantly creates a fully grown and educated new person, and the Doctor recognises her as his "daughter". Born a fighter, with combat skills and tactics automatically programmed, she is initially ideologically at odds with the Doctor's pacifism, but after learning she has two hearts and is connected to the near-extinct race of Time Lords, she begins to pattern her behaviour on that of her father.

Named "Jenny" by the Doctor's companion Donna (Catherine Tate) as she is a "generated anomaly", she is initially received with ambivalence by the Doctor, whom she reminds of the loss of his previous family. He eventually warms to her, however, and welcomes her aboard his crew as a companion. Just as peace appears to have been restored between the planet's warring factions, Jenny is shot and apparently killed. The Doctor cradles her dying form in his arms, and is visibly distraught when she does not revive or regenerate from the wound.  In the episode's closing scenes after the Doctor leaves, Jenny revives, takes a small spaceship, and takes off into the unknown to become an explorer like her father.

In the accompanying Doctor Who Confidential episode, David Tennant (who portrays the Doctor) refers to her as "another member of that race, or something closely akin to it." In the episode itself the Doctor says to Jenny, "You're an echo, that's all. A Time Lord is so much more. A sum of knowledge, a code, shared history, shared suffering", but later accepts her as his daughter, saying "You're going to be more than great; you're going to be amazing". Jenny's 'death' is shown during "Journey's End" when the Doctor recalls those who have died while helping him, as he did not know she revived.

Characterisation

Character creation
While it is well established within Doctor Who that the Doctor once had a family—his first incarnation having travelled with his granddaughter, Susan—this fact has been seldom referenced in the show. As executive producer Russell T Davies stated, when discussing the creation of Jenny as the Doctor's newest family member: "In the current series once or twice we've had fleeting little mentions, he said to Rose in the TARDIS in "Fear Her" that he'd been a father once. And now obviously this story, it's not a natural, biological daughter, you could argue, but this really brings him face to face with fatherhood."

Regarding the creation of the character Jenny, series producer Phil Collinson explained, "It came out of a desire to keep pushing David, and keep taking him in new directions, and keep challenging him, really. To suddenly find himself with a member of family is kind of one of the biggest challenges you could give him, so I'm chuffed we did it." Moffett has agreed that giving the character a daughter was "an interesting, emotional, dramatic place for the character to go," while the episode's writer, Stephen Greenhorn, has spoken of the manner in which creating Jenny allowed the show to broach "aspects of the Doctor's past life that we don't often get to discuss, about his previous family that he had and lost in the Time War." Steven Moffat suggested that the character lives in the episode's conclusion.

Casting

Before being cast as Jenny, Georgia Moffett had previously auditioned for a smaller role in Doctor Who episode "The Unicorn and the Wasp". Phil Collinson revealed that: "As soon as we saw her, we realised there was a much bigger and better part later on in the series... so Georgia kindly waited until the time was right." Coverage of her casting focused on the fact that she is the daughter of Peter Davison, who played the Doctor's fifth incarnation—as the Radio Times stated: "a Doctor's daughter is playing the Doctor's Daughter". She has described how, after her father filmed the 2007 Children in Need segment "Time Crash", in which the Fifth Doctor briefly returned to meet the Tenth Doctor, he called her to inform her: "Right, now it's your go." Discussing her casting as Jenny, they both relayed their amusement at the character's first line being "Hello, Dad," with Davison describing his own daughter playing the Doctor's daughter as "kind of surreal". He has denied that there was any nepotism involved in the casting process, explaining, "She got it off her own bat. I would love to get another part in Doctor Who, I'm certainly not going to get her one first." She has praised her character and the episode in which she appeared, asserting that: "If I'd had to write my ideal part in an episode of Doctor Who it would have been that script." She has also expressed a desire to return to the role, calling on the show's producers to "Bring Jenny back. Please!"

Characteristics
Over the course of the episode "The Doctor's Daughter", the character of Jenny undergoes marked change. Tennant explained: "She starts off not being particularly likeable but by the end she's learned a lot from her experiences and from The Doctor. She becomes something that he's very proud of." Initially, Jenny is portrayed as an "action hero" character, described by series producer Phil Collinson as: "a warrior. [...] She's born to fight. She's born to use weapons, she's born to karate chop and kick her feet", and by episode writer Stephen Greenhorn as: "a kind of manufactured soldier, with a kinda pre-programming towards aggression and war." Shortly after her creation within the episode, the character explains that she was born knowing just "How to fight, and how to die."

Learning from the Doctor, Jenny begins to adapt her ideology. Tennant explained that her character: "begins to become much more like the Doctor, and much more like a Time[lord]," describing the episode as "a journey," over the course of which Jenny learns to use her fighting skills "in the right way," developing morals as she grows on a personal level. Executive producer Russell T Davies has discussed the Doctor's initial reluctance to accept Jenny as his daughter, explaining, "It's awful for him in that this daughter is everything he wouldn't be; she's a soldier, she's got military protocols downloaded into her brain, she can fight, and she wants to fight, that's the important thing, that she thinks killing is fine." Greenhorn asserts that as the character develops, "You can see the Doctorishness in her. And you can see that actually, the reason he would warm to that is because he begins to recognise there are elements in her that are strong in him as well." Concluding the character's development over the course of the episode, Tennant surmised, "By the end of it, they've both realised that they want to be a little bit more like the other one, and admire that in each other."

Reception
Martin Anderson of Den of Geek! has suggested that the creation of a daughter character for the Doctor was a move designed to lay to rest decades long speculation that the Doctor himself might one day regenerate into a female form. He describes the act of reviving the character at the end of the episode as "a pretty cheap trick", but asserts that; "this is outshone by the big surprise at Jenny's career-choice at the conclusion of The Doctor's Daughter. Wow." Newsround Lizo Mzimba opines that Georgia Moffett's appearance as Jenny is "superb", while Doctor Who producer Phil Collinson has hailed the introduction of Jenny as the Doctor's daughter: "One of the best pre-title sequences we've ever had." Despite reviewing the episode "The Doctor's Daughter" poorly as a whole, Digital Spy Ben Rawson-Jones argues that Jenny "deserved a stronger narrative context for her debut", and that Georgia Moffett portrayed the character with "the right spirit, arrogance and compassion that befits a sprog of the Time Lord."

Ian Berriman, writing for SFX, is somewhat more critical of the character, stating: "we're not given much time to get to know Jenny (and you always suspect she's a redshirt), so her "death" is not as affecting as it could have been." The Stage Mark Wright is similarly critical of the character and her conception, writing: "I'll admit to feeling cheated that she isn't the real thing and it's a bit of techno-gubbins malarkey to give the Doctor something to emote against. I don't quite buy the bond that springs up between the Doctor and Georgia Moffett's Jenny (a name she is given rather quickly). She is a genetically engineered soldier with military tactics and skills programmed in, and knows what to do with a gun, much to the Doctor's horror. But why does he care, she isn't really his daughter?"

Georges Jeanty, artist of the comic series Buffy the Vampire Slayer Season Eight, felt that the character of Jenny was a homage to Joss Whedon's influential character Buffy Summers (Sarah Michelle Gellar), from Buffy the Vampire Slayer. Jeanty returned the favour by modelling Buffy's outfit in Season Eight #32 after Jenny's outfit in "The Doctor's Daughter".

Big Finish

In 2008, critics Anderson, Berriman, Wright, and The Times Andrew Billen all speculated that the character could return to the series in the future, with Anderson assessing that Jenny's episode's ending left "vast scope" for the return of the character in her own spin-off: "Moffett herself has the obvious credentials due to her real-life dad, and she's certainly young, attractive and athletic enough to cross quite a few barriers in viewer demographics." Billen adds: "If Jenny [...] does not spin off into, at least, her own comic books, I shall be surprised." Although the character was not subsequently featured on television, Big Finish Productions released an audio drama in 2018, bringing Georgia Moffett back to the role of Jenny, and another in 2021.

Series 1 (2018)

Series 2: Still Running (2021)

References

External links 

Television characters introduced in 2008
Female characters in television
Fictional clones
Fictional war veterans
Time Lords
Fictional women soldiers and warriors
Doctor Who audio characters